The discography of American rapper Clyde Carson consists of a studio album, three EPs, three compilation albums, three mixtapes and four singles.

His debut studio album S.T.S.A. 2 (Something To Speak About) was released on February 10, 2017, via Moe Doe Entertainment. His three EPs Doin' That, Bass Rock and Playboy were released in 2007, 2009 and 2014, respectively. Playboy peaked on the US Heatseeker chart at 28th. Carson's 2006 compilation album with the Team, titled World Premiere, had peaked on the US R&B and Hip Hop chart at 95th. His 2012 single featuring the Team, "Slow Down", peaked on the R&B and Rap Songs charts at 45th and 22nd respectively.

Studio albums

EPs

Collaboration albums

Mixtapes 

2001: The Story Vol. 1
2009: The Bay Star
2012: S.T.S.A. (Something To Speak About)

Singles

References 

Discographies of American artists
Hip hop discographies